Kenneth Australia Gavin (20 January 1883 – 24 May 1956) was a rugby union player who represented Australia.

Gavin, a prop, was born in Cudal, New South Wales and claimed 1 international rugby cap for Australia.

References

                   

Australian rugby union players
Australia international rugby union players
1883 births
1956 deaths
Rugby union players from New South Wales
Rugby union props